Herricks High School is a four-year comprehensive public high school with 1450 students accredited by the New York State Board of Regents and the Middle States Association. The school is located in Searingtown, New York, 20 miles east of Manhattan. Dr. Tony Sinanis is the superintendent of Herricks Union Free School District. He succeeded Dr. Fino Celano after the 2021-2022 school year. This school was involved in one of the major Supreme Court rulings affecting prayer in public schools in 1959. This school also received the National Blue Ribbon school distinction in 2017.

As of the 2014–15 school year, the school had an enrollment of 1,373 students and 94.2 classroom teachers (on an FTE basis), for a student–teacher ratio of 14.6:1. There were 61 students (4.4% of enrollment) eligible for free lunch and 29 (2.1% of students) eligible for reduced-cost lunch.

History
Herricks High School stands on Watermelon Hill. The land near the area was a burial ground for the Pearsall family starting in the 17th century, but the burial grounds were later removed.

The high school opened in September 1958 and had its first graduating class in 1960.

Known for the "Herricks Prayer Case, Engel v. Vitale," the Herricks School District (a.k.a. Union Free School District #9) was sued by five district property owners in 1959. "Almighty God, we acknowledge our dependence upon Thee, and we beg Thy blessings upon us, our parents, our teachers and our Country" was recited as a daily procedure on the recommendation of the NY State Board of Regents. This case was decided by the U. S. Supreme Court, which ruled the prayer unconstitutional in 1962.

In 2013, Herricks High School celebrated the Herricks School District's 200th anniversary.

In the late 2010s, the cafeterias received major renovations, creating a more inviting and open atmosphere.

Music and theater
The music department is home to ten different performing ensembles, including several advanced groups: Jazz Band, Wind Ensemble, Chamber Orchestra, and Chamber Choir.

Herricks is also home to Chapter 1975 of the Tri-M Music Honor Society.

Sports
Herricks High School offers the following sports: football, badminton, softball, baseball, tennis, soccer, wrestling, volleyball, lacrosse, basketball, bowling, swimming, track, Winter Track and Field, golf, cross country, fencing, and cheerleading.

Television 
Herricks High School has a television channel called HTN (Herricks Television Network) that goes with their TV Studio classes. The morning announcements air on HTN at around 9:30 AM Monday-Friday. HTN airs locally on Channel 47 on Verizon Fios, Channel 75 on Altice, and Channel 65 on Antenna TV.

Publications
Publications include the Highlander newspaper and the OPUS literary magazine.

Notable alumni

 Cliff Asness, hedge fund manager
Krishna Das, musician
 Nadine Faustin-Parker, three-time Olympian for the Republic of Haiti (2000, 2004, 2008)
 Alyssa A. Goodman, Class of 1980, Professor of Astronomy at Harvard University
 Alex Katz (baseball), baseball player in the Baltimore Orioles organization
 Liam McHugh, sports journalist
Kara Krebs Downey, physical therapist and Herricks Hall of Fame Athlete
 Eric J. Nestler, Chair of Neuroscience at Icahn School of Medicine at Mount Sinai
David Quinn, actor and co-founder of Allrecipes.com
 Joe Roth - film executive, producer and film director
 Matthew Senreich, screenwriter, producer & director
 Robert Sitkoff, Professor at Harvard Law School
 Larry Teng, director of multiple television series
Jai Wolf (Sajeeb Saha), electronic music producer
 Richard Zimler, novelist

References

External links
 

Public high schools in New York (state)
Schools in Nassau County, New York